Maze Park is a  urban nature reserve in Middlesbrough, England on the south bank of the Tees on part of the former Tees Marshalling Yard.
It was created by the Teesside Development Corporation
and is owned and run by the Tees Valley Wildlife Trust.
The reserve is a narrow triangle of land bounded by the River Tees, the old River Tees, and the Thornaby rail marshalling yards.

Facilities 

The area is rough grassland, supporting herbs and broad-leaved plants and has three landscaped viewing mounds
giving panoramic views of the Green Blue Heart of the Tees Corridor.
Passing through the reserve along the side of the River Tees is the Teesdale Way footpath and cycle route and there are butterfly styled metal cycle racks to park bicycles for those cyclists wishing to stop and take a closer look.
There is also a hanging butterfly sculpture on the side of a viewing mound.

An interpretation panel is present for the interested visitor and others are planned.
The western end of the nature reserve is close to and accessible from the Tees Barrage.
Portrack Marsh Nature Reserve is located on the opposite bank of the River Tees.

Flora and fauna 

Maze Park Nature Reserve supports a range of plants, insects and birds.
The area has a slag-based soil and is ideal for plants that grow in limestone and chalk meadows.
Plants in the reserve include bird's foot trefoil, common centaury, rocket, St John's wort and yellow-wort
and there was a school project to plant further wild plants such as viper's bugloss, greater knapweed, salad burnet and selfheal.
Insects to be found include damselfly, dingy skipper, grasshopper, grayling, ringlet, six-spot burnet moth and small copper.

The birds which are known to nest or visit include blackcap, common chaffinch, grasshopper warbler, grey partridge, kingfisher, sand martin, skylark and sparrowhawk.

References

External links 

 Pictures in Flickr.

Nature reserves in North Yorkshire
Middlesbrough
Parks in Middlesbrough